Gilles Devillers (born 12 February 1985) is a Belgian former professional racing cyclist.

Major results
2010
 7th Overall Kreiz Breizh Elites
2011
 3rd Overall Mi-Août en Bretagne
 7th Overall Tour de Bretagne
 9th Overall Circuit des Ardennes
2012
 1st  Mountains classification Tour du Limousin

References

1985 births
Living people
Belgian male cyclists